Michael Treharne Davies (13 March 1936 – 25 September 2004) was a British teacher and traditionalist Catholic writer of many books about the Catholic Church following the Second Vatican Council. From 1992 to 2004 he was the president of the international Traditionalist Catholic organisation Foederatio Internationalis Una Voce and was responsible for the unification of Una Voce America.

Life
Davies was born to Cyril and Annie (née Garnworthy) Davies. His father, a Welshman, was a Baptist, and his mother, who was English, was an Anglican. Davies was brought up in Yeovil, Somerset, but proud of his Welsh descent. He served as a regular soldier in the Somerset Light Infantry during the Malayan Emergency, the Suez Crisis, and the EOKA campaign in Cyprus.

Davies was a Baptist who converted to Catholicism while still a student in the 1950s. While initially a supporter of the Second Vatican Council, Davies became critical of the liturgical changes that followed in its wake, which he argued were a result of distortions and misreadings of the Council's mandates for liturgical reform.
Davies later supported the French Archbishop Marcel Lefebvre, founder of the Society of St. Pius X (SSPX), writing a three-volume series titled Apologia Pro Marcel Lefebvre in which he defended Lefebvre against accusations of disobedience and schism for refusing to celebrate the Mass of Paul VI. Although Davies opposed Lefebvre's canonically-illicit consecration of four SSPX bishops in 1988 against the wishes of Pope John Paul II, he continued to publicly support Lefebvre's defence of the Tridentine Mass and traditional Church teachings.

William D. Dinges, Professor of Religion and Culture at The Catholic University of America, described Davies as "[i]nternationally, one of the most prolific traditionalist apologists".

Davies was a critic of the alleged apparitions of the Blessed Virgin at Medjugorje, which he believed to be false.

Davies died on 25 September 2004, aged 68, following a battle with cancer and was buried in the churchyard of St. Mary's, Chislehurst, Kent. He was survived by his wife, Marija, one daughter and two sons,  one of whom is the barrister Adrian Davies.

Selected published works
The Liturgical Revolution (Vol. I: Cranmer's Godly Order Roman Catholic Books, vol. II Pope John's Council & vol III Pope Paul's New Mass: Angelus Press) 
Apologia Pro Marcel Lefebvre (Angelus Press) is a three volume book in support of the French Archbishop Marcel Lefebvre, founder of the Society of St. Pius X, 
 The Order of Melchisedech – 255pp, Roman Catholic Books, 
 Partisans of Error (on Modernism) – 109pp, Neumann Press (1982), 
 Newman Against the Liberals – 400pp, Roman Catholic Books (out of print)
 The Second Vatican Council and Religious Liberty – 326pp, Neumann Press, 
 I am with you always (on the Indefectibility of the Church) – 101pp, Neumann Press
 For Altar and Throne – The Rising in the Vendée – 100pp, The Remnant Press, 
 St John Fisher – 140pp, Neumann Press,  
 The Wisdom of Adrian Fortescue (edited by M. Davies) – 421pp, Roman Catholic Books, 
 Liturgical Shipwreck – TAN Books, 
Liturgical Timebombs in Vatican 2: Destruction of the Faith Through Changes in Catholic Worship – TAN Books,

References

External links
 Video Michael Davies at St. Athanasius (Traditional Catholic Chapel), Vienna, Virginia, 1988.
 Tribute from Una Voce America.
 The Catholic Sanctuary and the Second Vatican Council, by Michael Davies, criticising post-Vatican II architectural changes
 Apologia pro Marcel Lefebvre by Michael Davies, hosted by SSPX Asia.
 Michael Davies – An Evaluation by John S. Daly, a critique of Davies' theology (2015).

1936 births
2004 deaths
British writers
British traditionalist Catholics
Converts to Roman Catholicism from Baptist denominations
Traditionalist Catholic writers
Somerset Light Infantry soldiers
British military personnel of the Cyprus Emergency
People from Yeovil
British Army personnel of the Malayan Emergency
British people of Welsh descent
Place of death missing
Deaths from cancer in England
Military personnel from Somerset
Liturgists